Videodrome is a 1983 Canadian science fiction body horror film written and directed by David Cronenberg and starring James Woods, Sonja Smits, and Debbie Harry. Set in Toronto during the early 1980s, it follows the CEO of a small UHF television station who stumbles upon a broadcast signal of snuff films. Layers of deception and mind-control conspiracy unfold as he attempts to uncover the signal's source.

Distributed by Universal Pictures, Videodrome was the first film by Cronenberg to gain backing from any major Hollywood studio. With the highest budget of any of his films to date, the film was a box-office bomb, recouping only $2.1 million from a $5.9 million budget. The film received praise for the special makeup effects, Cronenberg's direction, Woods and Harry's performances, its "techno-surrealist" aesthetic, and its cryptic, psychosexual themes. Cronenberg won the Best Direction award and was nominated for seven other awards at the 5th Genie Awards.

Now considered a cult classic, the film has been cited as one of Cronenberg's best, and a key example of the body horror and science fiction horror genres.

Plot
Max Renn is the president of CIVIC-TV, a Toronto UHF television station specializing in sensationalist programming. Harlan, the operator of CIVIC-TV's unauthorized satellite dish, shows Max Videodrome, a plotless show apparently being broadcast from Malaysia which depicts anonymous victims being violently tortured and eventually murdered. Believing this to be the future of television, Max orders Harlan to begin unlicensed use of the show. Nicki Brand, a sadomasochistic radio host who becomes sexually involved with Max, is aroused by an episode of Videodrome, and goes to audition for the show when she learns that it is being broadcast out of Pittsburgh, but never returns. Max contacts Masha, a softcore pornographer, and asks her to help him find out the truth about Videodrome. Through Masha, Max learns that not only is the footage not faked, but it is the public "face" of a political movement. Masha further informs him that the enigmatic media theorist Brian O'Blivion knows about Videodrome.

Max tracks down O'Blivion to a homeless shelter where vagrants are encouraged to engage in marathon sessions of television viewing. He discovers that O'Blivion's daughter Bianca runs the mission, intending to help realize her father's vision of a world in which television replaces every aspect of everyday life. Later, Max views a videotape in which O'Blivion informs him that Videodrome is a socio-political battleground in which a war is being fought to control the minds of the people of North America before being garrotted by Nicki; Max then hallucinates that Nicki speaks directly to him and causes his television to undulate as he kisses the screen. Disturbed, Max returns to O'Blivion's homeless shelter. Bianca tells him Videodrome carries a broadcast signal that causes the viewer to develop a malignant brain tumor. O'Blivion helped to create it as part of his vision for the future, and viewed the hallucinations as a higher form of reality. When he found out it was to be used for malevolent purposes, he attempted to stop his partners; they used his own invention to kill him. In the year before his death, O'Blivion recorded tens of thousands of videos, which now form the basis of his television appearances.

Later that night, Max hallucinates placing his handgun in a slit in his abdomen. He is contacted by Videodromes producer, Barry Convex of the Spectacular Optical Corporation, an eyeglasses company that acts as a front for an arms company, who uses a device to record Max's fantasies of whipping Nicki. Max then wakes up to find Masha's corpse in his bed. He frantically calls Harlan to photograph the body as evidence, but, shortly after he arrives, her body is no longer anywhere to be found.

Wanting to see the latest Videodrome broadcast, Max meets Harlan at his studio. There, Harlan reveals that he has been working with Convex with the goal of recruiting Max to their cause: to end North America's cultural decay by giving fatal brain tumors to anyone so obsessed with sex and violence that they would watch Videodrome. Convex then inserts a brainwashing Betamax tape into Max's torso. Under Convex's influence, Max murders his colleagues at CIVIC-TV. He later attempts to murder Bianca, who manages to stop him by showing him a videotape of Nicki's murder on the Videodrome set. Bianca then 'reprograms' Max to her father's cause: "Death to Videodrome. Long live the new flesh." On her orders, he kills Harlan and Convex.

Wanted for their murders as well of those of his colleagues, Max takes refuge on a derelict boat in the Port Lands. Appearing to him on a television, Nicki tells him he has weakened Videodrome, but in order to completely defeat it, he must ascend to the next level and "leave the old flesh". The television then shows an image of Max shooting himself in the head, which causes the set to explode. Reenacting what he has just seen on the television, Max utters the words "Long live the new flesh" and shoots himself.

Cast

Production

Development 
The basis for Videodrome came from David Cronenberg's childhood. Cronenberg used to pick up American television signals from Buffalo, New York, late at night after Canadian stations had gone off the air, and worry he might see something disturbing not meant for public consumption. As Cronenberg explained, "I've always been interested in dark things and other people's fascinations with dark things. Plus, the idea of people locking themselves in a room and turning a key on a television set so that they can watch something extremely dark, and by doing that, allowing themselves to explore their fascinations." Cronenberg's first exploration of themes of the branding of sex and violence and media impacting people's reality was writing a treatment titled Network of Blood in the early 1970s; its premise was a worker for an independent television company (who would become Max Renn in Videodrome) unintentionally finding, in the filmmaker's words, "a private television network subscribed to by strange, wealthy people who were willing to pay to see bizarre things." He later planned the story to be told from the main character's first-person perspective, showcasing a duality between how insane he looks to other people and how he himself perceives a different reality in his head. Concepts similar to Network of Bloods were further explored in a 1977 episode of the CBC Television series Peep Show Cronenberg directed, named "The Victim." The film's fictional station CIVIC-TV was modeled on the real-life Canadian television network Citytv, which was known for broadcasting pornographic content and violent films in its late-night programming bloc The Baby Blue Movie.

Cronenberg's increased reputation with films like Scanners (1981) made it easier for his projects to get produced, leading to the film's $5.5 million budget, more interest from studios and producers, and a larger number of interested actors to choose from. After the box office success of Scanners, Cronenberg turned down the chance of directing Return of the Jedi, having had no desire to direct material produced by other filmmakers. Cronenberg met with Pierre David in Montreal to discuss ideas for a new film, with the former pitching two ideas, one of them being Videodrome.

Cronenberg started writing the first draft of Videodrome in January 1981, and, as with first drafts of Cronenberg's prior projects, included many parts not featured in the final cut to make it more acceptable for audiences; this included Renn having an explosive grenade as a hand after he chops off his flesh gun during a hallucination, Renn and Nicki melting, via a kiss, into an object that then melts an on-looker, and five other characters besides Barry also dying of cancer. Cronenberg admits that he was worried that the project would be rejected by Filmplan due to the excessive violent content of an early draft, but it was approved, with Claude Héroux joking that the movie would get a triple X rating. Although talent for the film was attracted using the first draft, alterations were made constantly from pre-production to post-production.

Accumulation of the cast and crew started in the summer of 1981 in Toronto, with most of the supporting actors being local performers of the city. Videodromes three producers, David, Claude Héroux and Victor Solnicki, suggested James Woods for the role of Max Renn; they unsuccessfully tried to attach him to another film they produced, Models (1982). Woods was a fan of Rabid (1977) and Scanners, and met Cronenberg in Beverly Hills for the part; Cronenberg liked the fact that Woods was very articulate in terms of delivery, and Woods appreciated the filmmaker's oddball style as well as being a "good controversialist" with "a lot of power." Cronenberg doubled for Woods in the scene where Max puts on the Videodrome helmet since the actor was afraid of getting electrocuted. Co-star Debbie Harry was recommended by David, and Cronenberg cast her after viewing her two times in Union City (1980) and a Toronto audition. She had never had such a large part before, and said that the more experienced Woods gave her a number of helpful suggestions.

Filming 
Principal photography for the film began on October 19, 1981, and ended in December of that same year, with the initial week of filming being devoted to videotaping various monitor inserts. These included the television monologues of Professor Brian O'Blivion, as well as the Videodrome torture scenes and the soft-core pornographic programs Samurai Dreams and Apollo & Dionysus. The video camera used for the monitor scenes was a Hitachi SK-91. The film's cinematography was handled by Mark Irwin, who was very uncomfortable with doing the monitor scenes; he was far more experienced with composing shots for regular film cameras than videotapes, disliked the flat television standards of lighting and color, and couldn't compose his shots privately as all of the film crew watched the monitors as the shots were being set up.

The Samurai Dreams short was filmed in half a day without any audio recorded at a rented spot at a Global TV studio in Toronto, and lasted five minutes longer than what ended up in the final film.

Three different endings were filmed. The ending used in the final film, wherein Max shoots himself on the derelict ship, was James Woods' idea. One of the initial intentions for the ending was to include an epilogue after the suicide, wherein Max, Bianca, and Nicki appear on the set of Videodrome. Bianca and Nicki are shown to have chest slits like Max, from which grotesque, mutated sex organs emerge. Cronenberg described his original vision of the ending as follows: "After the suicide, [Max] ends up on the 'Videodrome' set with Nicki, hugging and kissing and neat stuff like that. A happy ending? Well, it's my version of a happy ending—boy meets girl on the 'Videodrome' set, with the clay wall maybe covered in blood, but I'm not sure. Freudian rebirth imagery, pure and simple." In his director's commentary for the Criterion Collection release of the film, Cronenberg credited his decision to omit the epilogue at least partially to his own atheist beliefs, as the apparent resurrection of Max and Nicki on the Videodrome set could be interpreted as having gone to an afterlife, whereas Cronenberg himself does not believe in one.

Special effects 
The special makeup effects were devised by Rick Baker, with his crew composed mostly of twenty-year-olds; some of them had worked with Baker in An American Werewolf in London, while Michael Lennick served as special video effects supervisor. To create the breathing effects of the television set that Max interacts with, Frank C. Carere utilized an air compressor with valves hooked to a piano keyboard that he himself operated. The undulating screen of the television set was created using a video projector and a sheet of rubbery dental dam. Baker stated that "I knew we would need a flexible material ... we tested with a weather balloon first, stretching it over a frame the size of a TV screen, and pushed a hand through it to see how far it stretched, and then we rear-projected on it." Betamax videotape cassettes were used as items to be inserted into Max's stomach slit, because VHS cassettes were too large to fit the faux abdominal wound. Woods found the stomach slit uncomfortable, and after a long day of wearing it, vented, "I am not an actor anymore. I'm just the bearer of the slit!" Baker's original concept for Max's flesh gun featured eyes, mouth and foreskin, which Cronenberg found to be "too graphic". The cancer effects caused by Max's flesh gun went through various tests, with some tests having the face of the victim being distorted through the use of solvents, but Baker decided against this upon learning that his mentor, Dick Smith, had recently used the same technique in  Spasms. Baker settled on having the cancer tumors burst out from the body of Barry Convex, with his crew operating a dummy underneath the set. Lennick devised effects such as having the image of the Videodrome television set distort whenever Max would whip it through the use of a device which he called the "Videodromer", and glitch and twitch effects related to Max's visions through the Videodrome helmet, but these effects were scrapped due to budget and time concerns.

Music 

An original score was composed for Videodrome by Cronenberg's close friend, Howard Shore. The score was composed to follow Max Renn's descent into video hallucinations, starting out with dramatic orchestral music that increasingly incorporates, and eventually emphasizes, electronic instrumentation. To achieve this, Shore composed the entire score for an orchestra before programming it into a Synclavier II digital synthesizer. The rendered score, taken from the Synclavier II, was then recorded being played in tandem with a small string section. The resulting sound was a subtle blend that often made it difficult to tell which sounds were real and which were synthesized.

The soundtrack was also released on vinyl by Varèse Sarabande, and was re-released on compact disc in 1998. The album itself is not just a straight copy of Shore's score, but a remix. Shore has commented that while there were small issues with some of the acoustic numbers, "on the whole I think they did very well".

Themes 
According to Tim Lucas, Videodrome deals with "the impression of a sprawlingly technological world on our human senses; the fascination and horror of sex and violence; and the boundaries of reality and consciousness." Cronenberg modeled Brian O'Blivion and his theories on Marshall McLuhan, who taught at the University of Toronto when he attended it.

Reception
Its consensus states, "Visually audacious, disorienting, and just plain weird, Videodrome musings on technology, entertainment, and politics still feel fresh today." It has been described as a "disturbing techno-surrealist film" and "burningly intense, chaotic, indelibly surreal, absolutely like nothing else".

Janet Maslin of The New York Times remarked on the film's "innovativeness", and praised Woods' performance as having a "sharply authentic edge". Adam Smith of Empire gave the film 4 out of 5 possible stars, calling it a "perfect example" of body horror. The staff of Variety wrote that the film "proves more fascinating than distancing", and commended the "stunning visual effects". Gary Arnold of The Washington Post gave the film a negative review, calling it "simultaneously stupefying and boring".

C.J. Henderson reviewed Videodrome in The Space Gamer No. 63. Henderson commented that "Despite the fact that Videodrome came and went faster than Superman and his bullet, it is still an excellent picture. It is a genre film of high caliber, posing a number of important questions."

Christopher John reviewed Videodrome in Ares Magazine #14 and commented that "As usual, Cronenberg has pulled no punches in getting his message across. The movie is tight, and perfectly clear for anyone willing to watch the screen and think about what they are seeing."

Trace Thurman of Bloody Disgusting listed it as one of eight "horror movies that were ahead of their time". It was also selected as one of the "23 weirdest films of all time" by Total Film. Nick Schager of Esquire ranked the film at number 10 on their list of "the 50 best horror movies of the 1980s".

Awards
The film won a number of awards upon its release. At the 1984 Brussels International Festival of Fantasy Film, it tied with Bloodbath at the House of Death for Best Science-Fiction Film, and Mark Irwin received a CSC Award for Best Cinematography in a Theatrical Feature. Videodrome was also nominated for eight Genie Awards, with David Cronenberg tying Bob Clark's A Christmas Story for Best Achievement in Direction.

Videodrome was named the 89th-most-essential film in history by the Toronto International Film Festival.

Home media
Videodrome was released on VHS and DVD in the late 1990s by Universal Studios Home Entertainment, who also released the film on LaserDisc.

The film was released on DVD by the Criterion Collection on August 31, 2004, and their Blu-ray edition was released on December 7, 2010. The Criterion Blu-ray features two commentary tracks, one with Cronenberg and cinematographer Mark Irwin, and the other with actors James Woods and Deborah Harry. Among the other special features are a documentary titled Forging the New Flesh; the soft-core video Samurai Dreams; the 2000 short film Camera; three trailers for Videodrome; and Fear on Film, which consists of an interview with Cronenberg, John Carpenter and John Landis, hosted by Mick Garris.

In 2015, Arrow Films released the film on Blu-ray in Region B with further special features, including Cronenberg's short films Transfer (1966) and From the Drain (1967), as well as his feature films Stereo (1969) and Crimes of the Future (1970).

Novelization
A novelization of Videodrome was released by Zebra Books alongside the movie in 1983. Though credited to "Jack Martin", the novel was, in fact, the work of horror novelist Dennis Etchison. Cronenberg reportedly invited Etchison up to Toronto, where they discussed and clarified the story, allowing the novel to remain as close as possible to the actions in the film. There are some differences, however, such as the inclusion of the "bathtub sequence", a scene never filmed in which a television rises from Max Renn's bathtub like in Sandro Botticelli's The Birth of Venus. This was the result of the lead time required to write the book, which left Etchison working with an earlier draft of the script than was used in the film.

See also
 Pirate television
 Snuff film

References

Bibliography

Sources
 Lucas, Tim. Studies in the Horror Film - Videodrome. Lakewood, CO: Centipede Press, 2008. .

External links

 
 
 
 
 
 
 Videodrome review (archived) at InternalBleeding
 Videodrome: The Slithery Sense of Unreality an essay by Gary Indiana at the Criterion Collection
 understanding media - Videodrome, a list of academic texts about the film

1983 films
1983 horror films
1983 science fiction films
1980s English-language films
1980s science fiction horror films
Articles containing video clips
Canadian body horror films
Canadian science fiction horror films
English-language Canadian films
Films about pornography
Films about television
Films directed by David Cronenberg
Films scored by Howard Shore
Films set in Toronto
Films shot in Toronto
Films about snuff films
Techno-horror films
Universal Pictures films
1980s Canadian films
Postmodern films